Rosokhrankultura, full name: Federal Service for monitoring compliance with cultural heritage protection law, is a state agency of Russia responsible for keeping the national register of cultural heritage, enforcing preservation of listed properties through monitoring compliance with preservation law and enforcing compliance with copyright law, including licensing of copyright management agencies.

As at May, 2009, the agency is subordinated to the federal Ministry of Culture. For a brief period in 2008 Rosokhrankultura was merged into the Russian Federal Surveillance Service for Mass Communications, Communications but was eventually reorganized back into an independent agency. It is chaired, since June 2008, by Alexander Kibovsky (born 1973), historian of Imperial Russian Army and a lecturer on military costume at the Moscow Art Theatre college.

In September 2008 Rosokhrankultura performed a survey of damages of the 2008 South Ossetia War in South Ossetia.

External links
 Federal Service for monitoring compliance with cultural heritage protection law

References

Politics of Russia